The Rural Municipality of Canaan No. 225 is a rural municipality (RM) in the Canadian province of Saskatchewan within Census Division No. 7 and  Division No. 3.

History 
The RM of Canaan No. 225 incorporated as a rural municipality on January 1, 1913.

Geography

Communities and localities 
The following urban municipalities are surrounded by the RM.

Villages
 Lucky Lake

The following unincorporated communities are within the RM.

Localities
 Bernard
 Greenbrie

Demographics 

Attractions 
 Lucky Lake Heritage Museum
 Lucky Lake Heritage Marsh
 Palliser Regional Park
 Riverhurst Ferry

Government 
The RM of Canaan No. 225 is governed by an elected municipal council and an appointed administrator that meets on the second Thursday of every month. The reeve of the RM is Lars Bjorgan while its administrator is Melanie Dyck. The RM's office is located in Lucky Lake.

Transportation 
 Saskatchewan Highway 42
 Saskatchewan Highway 45
 Saskatchewan Highway 373
 Saskatchewan Highway 646
 Saskatchewan Highway 737
 Lucky Lake Airport
 Riverhurst Ferry

See also 
List of rural municipalities in Saskatchewan

References 

C

Division No. 7, Saskatchewan